Spectrin, beta, non-erythrocytic 5 also known as SPTBN5 is a protein that in humans is encoded by the SPTBN5 gene. SPTBN5 belongs to the spectrin family of cytoskeletal proteins.

Structure and function 

SPTBN5 contains the following domains:

 actin-binding domain
 membrane-association domain-1
 self-association domain
 C-terminal pleckstrin homology domain.

Based on these structural features it is thought that SPTBN5 is likely to form heterodimers and oligomers with alpha-spectrin and to interact directly with cellular membranes.

SPTBN5 is highly expressed in embryoid bodies.

References

Further reading